Chiropterotriton, also known as splayfoot salamanders or flat-footed salamanders, is a genus of salamanders in the family Plethodontidae. The genus is endemic to Mexico.

Chiropterotriton are widely distributed in northern and eastern Mexico. They are an ecologically diverse group, occupying a range of habitats, including cloud forests, pine-oak forests, oak forests, and caves. They may be found in various microhabitats, such as arboreal bromeliads, rock crevices, caves, and terrestrial cover objects. Most species are superficially similar in their appearance, making species delimitation by purely morphological means difficult. However, molecular methods have aided description of new species.

Species
As of early 2019, this genus includes the following 18 species:

References

 
Endemic amphibians of Mexico
Taxa named by Edward Harrison Taylor
Amphibian genera
Taxonomy articles created by Polbot